Timofey Shapkin (March 5, 1885 – March 22, 1943) was a Soviet corps commander. He served in the Imperial Russian Army during World War I before going over to the Bolsheviks. He fought in the war against Poland.

In World War II, he commanded the 4th Cavalry Corps.
In March 1943, he fell seriously ill and died on March 22 in a hospital in Rostov-on-Don from a cerebral hemorrhage.

He was a recipient of the Order of the Red Banner and the Order of Kutuzov.

Bibliography

1885 births
1943 deaths
Russian military personnel of World War I
People of the Russian Civil War
Soviet military personnel of World War II
Soviet lieutenant generals
Recipients of the Order of the Red Banner
Recipients of the Order of Kutuzov, 2nd class
Frunze Military Academy alumni